Metachroma quercatum is a species of leaf beetle. It is found in the eastern United States, where its range spans from Texas to Florida and New York to Kansas. Its length is between 3.2 and 4.2 mm. The species is named after the scientific name of the oak (Quercus), one of the species' host plants.

References

Further reading

 

Eumolpinae
Articles created by Qbugbot
Beetles described in 1801
Taxa named by Johan Christian Fabricius
Beetles of the United States